Asante is both an Ashanti surname and a masculine Ashanti given name. Notable people with the Ashanti name include:

As a surname
Akwasi Asante (born 1992), Dutch footballer
Amma Asante (born 1969), British film director and producer
Amma Asante (politician) (born 1972), Dutch politician
Anita Asante (born 1985), English footballer
David Asante (1834-1892), Akan Basel missionary, linguist and educator 
Ernest Asante (born 1988), Ghanaian footballer
Gyearbuor Asante (1941–2000), Ghanaian actor
Kofi Asante Ofori-Atta, Ghanaian politician
Kyle Asante (born 1991), English footballer
Larry Asante (born 1988), American football player
Molefi Kete Asante (born 1942), American writer, scholar, historian, and philosopher
M.K. Asante Jr. (born 1982), American writer, filmmaker, and professor
Okyerema Asante, Ghanaian drummer
Shaheera Asante (born 1966), British radio and television presenter
Solomon Asante (born 1990), Ghanaian footballer
Uriah Asante (1992–2016), Ghanaian footballer
Yaw Asante (born 1991), Ghanaian footballer

As a given name
Asante Blackk (born 2001), American actor
Asante Cleveland (born 1992), American football player
Asante Gullit Okyere (born 1988), Italian football player
Asante Samuel (born 1981), American football player
Asante Samuel Jr. (born 1999), American football player

In fiction
Mr Asante, a Ghanaian barber shop owner played by Samuel Frimpong in the British web series Corner Shop Show.

Ashanti given names
Surnames of Ashanti origin
Akan given names
Surnames of Akan origin
African masculine given names